Andrzej Szajna (born 30 September 1949) is a retired Polish artistic gymnast who won two individual bronze medals at the 1974 World Championships. He competed at the 1972, 1976 and 1980 Summer Olympics with the best individual result of sixth place all-around and on parallel bars in 1976. At the European championships he shared gold medal on the floor with Nikolai Andrianov in 1975 and placed second on the vault behind Andrianov in 1971, 1973 and 1975.

Szajna is a family man with five daughters and two sons, who had refused several offers to move to another sports club in Poland or United States. He retired after winning five medals at the 1984 Polish championships, including two gold medals. Until 1989 he served with the Polish Army and later worked as a bodyguard. He remained active in gymnastics as a coach and referee.

References

1949 births
Living people
Gymnasts at the 1972 Summer Olympics
Gymnasts at the 1976 Summer Olympics
Gymnasts at the 1980 Summer Olympics
Olympic gymnasts of Poland
Polish male artistic gymnasts
Sportspeople from Wrocław